Lake Onslow is a man-made lake east of Roxburgh and south of Alexandra in the Otago region of New Zealand. It is the site considered for a pumped-storage hydroelectricity project.

History
Lake Onslow first formed in 1890 when a dam was built that flooded the Dismal Swamp; the Teviot River flowed through the swamp. The water from this lake was used for mining, irrigation and hydroelectricity. The water usage rights jointly sit with Pioneer Energy (formerly the Otago Central Electric Power Board) and the Teviot Irrigation Company.

In 2019, the Interim Climate Change Committee proposed that the lake be used for a pumped hydro-storage system to provide backup electricity generation in dry years. The project had first been considered by hydrologist Earl Bardsley of the University of Waikato since 2002 and proposed in 2005. In July 2020, Minister of Energy Megan Woods announced that the New Zealand government would fund a detailed feasibility study of the plan. If progressed, the scheme would be the biggest infrastructure project in New Zealand since the 1980s, employ an estimated 3500 to 4500 people, and take four to five years to build and a further two years to fill. One option could be 5 TWh of storage and a 1.2 GW power station, equivalent to half a year of full production.

If the project goes ahead it will completely drown and submerge the best remaining example in New Zealand of a small scroll plain with its swirling and migrating meanders (formerly known as Dismal Swamp). The scroll plain is a miniature example of the famous Taieri Scroll Plains nearby and has formed because of the low and decreasing gradient of the stream valley due to slow progressive tectonic back-tilting of the catchment.

In March 2023 the government estimated the cost of the storage project at $15.7 billion.

References

External links
 Onslow Pumped Storage – Earl Bardsley

Lakes of Otago
Pumped-storage hydroelectric power stations
Proposed renewable energy power stations in New Zealand
Proposed pumped-storage hydroelectric power stations